A heraldic knot (referred to in heraldry as simply a knot) is a knot, unknot, or design incorporating a knot used in European heraldry. While a given knot can be used on more than one family's achievement of arms, the family on whose coat the knot originated usually gives its name to the said knot (the exception being the Tristram knot). These knots can be used to charge shields and crests, but can also be used in badges or as standalone symbols of the families for whom they are named (like Scottish plaids). The simplest of these patterns, the Bowen knot, is often referred to as the heraldic knot in symbolism and art outside of heraldry.

Heraldic knots

References

Decorative knots
Knot
 
Knot